LOL - Chi ride è fuori is an Italian comedy show of 2021 distributed by Amazon Prime Video and hosted by Fedez, Mara Maionchi (first edition) and Frank Matano (second edition), based on the format of Japanese comedian Hitoshi Matsumoto's Documental. The first four episodes were published on 1 April 2021, while the remaining two were made available on April 8.

On April 23, 2021, the game show was renewed for a second edition. The first 4 episodes of the second edition were released on February 24, 2022, while the remaining 2 on March 3, 2022.

Rules 
The rules are the same as other editions: 10 comedians are locked in a house-theater for six consecutive hours. The goal of each player is to make others laugh by any means: jokes, gags, props (present in a special "locker room" or brought from outside). In case of laughter, smiles and grimaces, a player is initially cautioned with a yellow card and, subsequently, sent off with a red card and then eliminated from the game. Furthermore, the players are obligated to actively participate in the game, under penalty of a warning or elimination.

The conductors (here defined as host and co-host), positioned in the so-called control room, observe and comment on what is happening in the room through a camera system and, using a console, give the competitors precise commands and / or suggest to them inputs for comic interventions. The last player remaining wins. The final prize is 100,000 euros, which the winner will donate entirely to charity.

First edition

Competitors 

 Angelo Pintus
 Caterina Guzzanti
 Ciro Priello
 Elio
 Frank Matano
 Gianluca Fru
 Katia Follesa
 Lillo
 Luca Ravenna
 Michela Giraud

Elimination table 
  W   The competitor wins the game
  S   The competitor has not undergone any action and is still safe
  A   The competitor is warned but continues the game
  E   The competitor is expelled and exits the game
  E   The competitor is warned and expelled in the same episode 

The winner, Ciro Priello, donates his 100,000 euros prize to ActionAid.

Second edition

Competitors 

 Alice Mangione
 Corrado Guzzanti
 Diana Del Bufalo
 Gianmarco Pozzoli
 Maccio Capatonda
 Mago Forest
 Maria Di Biase
 Max Angioni
 Tess Masazza
 Virginia Raffaele

Elimination table 
  W   The competitor wins the game
  S   The competitor has not undergone any action and is still safe
  A   The competitor is warned but continues the game
  E   The competitor is expelled and exits the game

The winner, Maccio Capatonda, donates his 100,000 euros prize to WWF.

Promotion 
The official trailer was released on March 19, 2021, while a one-hour aftershow was released online on April 26, attended by 10 comedians from the first edition.

Reviews 
In an interview with Variety magazine, Nicole Morganti, head of Italian productions of the Amazon Prime Video platform, stated that the game show was the most viewed title ever on the platform.

Notes

References 
Italian television series
Television series set in 2021

2021 Italian television series debuts